Monstera glaucescens is a flowering plant in genus Monstera of the arum family, Araceae.

Distribution 
It is native to South east Nicaragua to North west Colombia.

References 

glaucescens